Anti-communist resistance may refer to:

 Soviet: Anti-Soviet partisans
 Poland: Anti-communist resistance in Poland (disambiguation)
 Romania: Romanian anti-communist resistance movement
 Baltic States: Guerrilla war in the Baltic states
 Ukraine: Ukrainian Insurgent Army
 Germany: Werwolf
 Croatia: Crusaders
 Finland: Lapua Movement

See also
 Anti-communism